Sir Taurus is a Standardbred harness racehorse, foaled on March 20, 1984 at Lindy Farms in Somersville, Connecticut in the United States. Sir Taurus' sire was Speedy Crown, and his dam was Vanessa Hill. Speedy Crown's sire was Speedy Scot, and his dam was Missile Toe; Vanessa Hill's sire was Hickory Pride, and her dam was Viola Hill.

Career
Sir Taurus' winnings were $484,810, after racing for only two years in 1986 and 1987. He had 11 major wins during his racing career.  Sir Taurus was a world champion; co-holder of a world record for three-year-old colt trotters on a half-mile track with a time of 1:57.2h; and had set six track records throughout his career at that time. His fastest time for the mile was 1:56.3. As a two-year-old, Sir Taurus tied or held track records at Syracuse, Pompano, and Greenwood. As a three-year-old, he held track records at Brandywine Raceway, Goshen, and Pocono.

Sir Taurus' trainer and driver was Jimmy Takter for the Antonacci family and Daniel R. Gernatt, Sr. of Dan Gernatt Farms. The Yonkers Raceway in Yonkers, New York annually holds the Sir Taurus Trot for Standardbred harness racing.

Progeny
Of Sir Taurus' nearly 700 offspring, Approved Action (1:54.1) earned the most in winnings with $715,676. Sir Taurus' offspring have earned $23.7 million in combined winnings. Of all offspring of Sir Taurus (with Amanda T. Collins, a daughter of Texas), Red Hot Blue Chip sold for the most money at $52,000 in 1999.

Retirement
Said to be an easygoing horse with a gentle nature, Sir Taurus turned 30 in 2014, and is at Blue Chip Farms, now retired, providing school children and scouts with opportunities to visit him. On July 5, 2014, Sir Taurus appeared for photo opportunities with visitors at the horse racetrack in Goshen.

Pedigree

References

Harness racing in the United States
American Standardbred racehorses
American Champion racehorses
1984 racehorse births
Racehorses trained in the United States